Bad luck may refer to:

 Bad luck, harmful, negative, or undesirable luck or fortune

Film and television
 Bad Luck (1960 film), a comedy film directed by Andrzej Munk
 Bad Luck (2015 film), a tragic-comic film directed by Thomas Woschitz
 "Bad Luck" (Grimm), a television episode

Music
 Bad Luck, a 2009 album by Trophy Scars
 "Bad Luck" (Harold Melvin & the Blue Notes song), 1975
 "Bad Luck" (Social Distortion song), 1992
 "Bad Luck", a song by Indiana, 2017
 "Bad Luck", a song by Khalid from Free Spirit, 2019
 "Bad Luck", a song by Neko Case from Hell-On, 2018
 "Bad Luck", a song by SL, 2020
 "Bad Luck", a song by the Story So Far from What You Don't See, 2013

Places
 Bad Luck Creek (disambiguation), several streams in the US
 Bad Luck Mountain, in the Adirondack Mountains, New York, US

Other
 Bad Luck, a fictional band in the manga/anime Gravitation
Bad Luck, a 2016 book by Pseudonymous Bosch

See also
 "Bad Luck Blues", a 1933 song by Dorothea Trowbridge
 List of bad luck signs
 Good luck (disambiguation)
 Luck (disambiguation)
 Misfortune (disambiguation)